Klaus Zaczyk (born 25 May 1945) is a former international German football player.

He appeared in 400 matches in the Bundesliga. Zaczyk played his only game for West Germany on 22 February 1967, scoring a goal in a 5–1 friendly win against Morocco.

Honours
Hamburger SV
 UEFA Cup Winners' Cup: 1976–77
 DFB-Pokal: 1975–76

References

External links
 
 
 

1945 births
Living people
German footballers
Germany international footballers
Karlsruher SC players
1. FC Nürnberg players
Hamburger SV players
KSV Hessen Kassel players
Bundesliga players
Association football midfielders
Silesian-German people
World War II refugees
German refugees
People from Marburg-Biedenkopf
Sportspeople from Giessen (region)
Footballers from Hesse
West German footballers